Asciodes is a genus of snout moths in the subfamily Spilomelinae of the family Crambidae. The genus was erected by Achille Guenée in 1854 with  Asciodes gordialis as type species.

The five species are distributed from the southern United States (California, Arizona, Texas, Florida, South Carolina) and Mexico over the Caribbean (Cuba, Jamaica, Dominican Republic, Puerto Rico, Lesser Antilles) to the tropical and subtropical South America (Argentina, Brazil, Ecuador).

Like other Asciodini, caterpillars of Asciodes commonly feed on Caryophyllales. So far, only the food plants of Asciodes gordialis larvae have been recorded, which are mostly Bougainvillea, Mirabilis and Pisonia (all in the Nyctaginaceae family), but also non-Caryophyllales like Citrus (Rutaceae) and Manihot esculenta (Euphorbiaceae).

Species
Asciodes denticulinea (Schaus, 1940)
Asciodes gordialis Guenée, 1854
Asciodes quietalis (Walker, 1859)
Asciodes scopulalis Guenée, 1854
Asciodes titubalis Möschler, 1890

References

Spilomelinae
Crambidae genera
Taxa named by Achille Guenée